Nimrod is a character in the Big Finish Productions audio plays Project: Twilight, Project: Lazarus and Project: Destiny written by Cavan Scott and Mark Wright, which are based on the British science fiction television series Doctor Who. He is an original character and does not appear in the television series, and should not be confused with the character of the same name from the serial Ghost Light (1989).

Nimrod works for the Forge, a top-secret organization responsible for experimenting with extraterrestrial material. During World War I Dr William Abberton was responsible for genetic experiments on vampire DNA — the so-called Project: Twilight — creating a hybrid race to act as super-soldiers. However, when the hybrids escaped, Abberton was mortally injured, only saving himself by injecting himself with the Twilight Virus, turning himself into a hybrid as well. He took the code name Nimrod, after the legendary hunter king, and hunted down the survivors of his vampire experiments.  Over the years, he endured genetic alterations to stabilize his condition, even getting several cybernetic implants. Years later, he replaced Colonel Crichton as Deputy Director of the Forge.

He first met the Sixth Doctor and Evelyn Smythe in 1999, while tracking down the last of the vampires to a casino called Dusk.  Evelyn befriended a girl who worked there called Cassie.  Cassie had left her son Tommy with his grandmother up north while Cassie tried to earn a good living in London.  But the vampires turned her into one of their own and she was the only one of them to escape when Nimrod destroyed the Dusk.  He eventually found her in Norway, where the Doctor had left her while he tried to create a cure.  He brainwashed her and made her his replacement field agent, Artemis.

He then began work on Project: Lazarus, a plan to create clones of the Doctor to discover the secrets of Time Lord regeneration.  Once the Doctor had created a cure for the Twilight Virus, he and Evelyn returned to administer it to Cassie a few years later.  But Nimrod captured the Doctor, took samples from his body and murdered Cassie before she could be cured.  After the Doctor escaped, Nimrod started work on the cloning    process, and succeeded in creating multiple identical versions of the Sixth Doctor.  He clinically murdered many of them, but they all failed to regenerate.  They were each short lived, but he kept them as a sort of pet, one at a time, dressing them like the real Doctor and tricking them into being his Scientific Adviser.  After a few years of this, the Seventh Doctor arrived at the Forge and revealed the truth to his clone.  Enraged by this, the replica Doctor destroyed the Forge.  Nimrod escaped, but he believed it was the real Doctor that obliterated the facility.

Although their building was gone, the Forge continued.  They re-branded themselves as the public face of alien encounters.  Even Nimrod became a public figure, now calling himself Sir William Abberton.  But in 2026 a deadly alien mutagen escaped from the Forge, forcing most of London to be evacuated.  The Seventh Doctor arrived in the middle of this emergency, but he was younger than the version that saw the destruction of the Forge two decades previously.  With the Doctor were his companions Ace and Hex.  Nimrod already knew that Hex was Cassie's son, now a grown man.  He played on Hex's doubts and fears and confusion to drive a wedge between him and the Doctor.  He even convinced Hex to resurrect the remains of his mother, but she returned as a monstrous zombie.  However, her instincts were retained and she quickly turned on Nimrod and killed him.  Meanwhile, the Forge was overthrown by his second in command, Captain Aristedes, whose initial hostility at the Doctor for his role in the destruction of the Forge shifted to Nimrod when the Doctor devised a cure for the mutagen that Nimrod explicitly modified to kill the victims rather than cure them. Aristedes thus implemented Project: Destiny, and Nimrod and the Forge were destroyed.

The Short Trips: Defining Patterns book contains the short story Twilight's End.  The new Forge skyscraper was the most scientifically advanced building in the world, but it was hardwired to the remains of Nimrod, kept in a sealed vault deep below the property.  The Seventh Doctor arrives, leaving a syringe containing the Twilight Cure, giving Nimrod the choice to use it.

Personality
Nimrod is an unethical scientist who does not suffer fools gladly. He is cruel and sadistic, as seen in his treatment of the Huldan alien creature and of the Doctor clones he created during Project: Lazarus. He is bald and has almost completely colourless skin and lips, while his eyes are a vibrant blue. His cybernetic implants allow him to link to Oracle, the Forge's supercomputer, and also keep track of the vital signs of other Forge personnel in the vicinity. His weapon of choice is a specially designed crossbow.

Nimrod is played by British actor Stephen Chance. A novel, Project: Valhalla, by Scott and Wright, featuring Nimrod and the Forge, was published in December 2005. Also in 2005, a webcomic called The Forge: Project Longinus began serialisation, written by Scott and Wright and illustrated by Bryan Coyle.

External links 
Cavan Scott's website

Doctor Who audio characters
Fictional scientists